In the English language, animals have different names depending on whether they are male, female, young, domesticated, or in groups.

The best-known source of many English words used for collective groupings of animals is The Book of Saint Albans, an essay on hunting published in 1486 and attributed to Juliana Berners. Most terms used here may be found in common dictionaries and general information web sites.

Generic terms
The terms in this table apply to many or all taxons in a particular biological family, class, or clade.

Terms by species or taxon

Usage of collective nouns
Merriam-Webster writes that most terms of venery fell out of use in the 16th century, including a "murder" for crows. It goes on to say that some of the terms in The Book of Saint Albans were "rather fanciful", explaining that the book extended collective nouns to people of specific professions, such as a "poverty" of pipers. It concludes that for lexicographers, many of these don't satisfy criteria for entry by being "used consistently in running prose" without meriting explanation. Some terms that were listed as commonly used were "herd", "flock", "school", and "swarm".

Writing for Audubon, Nicholas Lund says that many such terms are not used in actuality. When he interviewed scientists who specialize in studying specific animals, they had not heard of these terms, such as a "bask" of crocodiles or "wisdom" of wombats, being applied in their fields. Lund noted that the common plural nouns for animals were "flock" for birds and "herd" for cows, conceding that for certain animals in small groups, there was currency in usage such as a "pod" of whales or "gaggle" of geese.

See also
 Animal epithet
 Lists of animals
 List of animal sounds
 wikt:Appendix:Animals, a similar list on English Wiktionary

Notes

References

Further reading
Peter Gray, "The encyclopedia of the biological sciences", 1970

Names
Animals